The Ceylon Journal of Medical Science is a peer-reviewed medical journal that started out as Section D of the Ceylon Journal of Science, which was first published in 1924 by the Government of Ceylon. It obtained its current name in 1965 and is now being published by the University of Colombo. The journal publishes articles, reviews, original research, and case reports in medicine and medical sciences.

References

External links 

University of Colombo
Publications established in 1965
English-language journals
General medical journals